Gurratan Singh (born May 13, 1984) is a former Indo-Canadian politician who was elected to the Legislative Assembly of Ontario in the 2018 provincial election. He represented the riding of Brampton East as a member of the Ontario New Democratic Party. He was defeated in the 2022 Ontario general election.

Early life and education 
Born on May 13, 1984, in St John's, Newfoundland, Singh is the brother of federal New Democratic Party leader Jagmeet Singh.

Singh holds an Honours Bachelor of Arts in philosophy and religious studies from McMaster University in Hamilton, Ontario.

Later, Singh attended Osgoode Hall Law School at York University in Toronto and graduated with the degree of Juris Doctor in 2010.

Controversy 
Singh ignited controversy days before the 2018 election when a photo of him holding a poster reading "Fuck the Police" in a 2006 Facebook post surfaced. NDP leader Andrea Horwath defended Singh and allowed Singh to remain a member of the NDP, saying "That's a sign that's despicable,". "Gurratan has actually said so as well. He's very regretful that he held that sign a number of years ago." Horwath said that Singh is a different person now compared to when he held up that sign at a 2006 rally. "When I was 20 there's things I probably did that I regret," she said. "It's not on Facebook though, there wasn't Facebook when I was 20." "Gurratan Singh is a person that turned his life around. He went to law school. He now upholds the law in the justice system," Horwath added. "People make mistakes when they're young."

Singh issued a statement apologizing "unreservedly to police officers, their families and the policing community", saying he was "deeply ashamed" of his actions. "I deeply respect the sacrifices police officers make in service of justice and public safety, and realize the importance of community-building with officers," he said.

Then-Premier Kathleen Wynne called a photo of Singh holding the sign a "very disturbing and divisive image." "As leaders, we all have to answer for the beliefs and the behaviour of our candidates," she said. "This is a very disturbing situation and Andrea Horwath is going to have to explain how she can continue to support a candidate in that position. I would not be able to support his candidacy."

Electoral record

References 

Ontario New Democratic Party MPPs
21st-century Canadian politicians
Living people
Politicians from Brampton
Canadian Sikhs
Canadian politicians of Punjabi descent
Canadian politicians of Indian descent
21st-century Canadian lawyers
Politicians from St. John's, Newfoundland and Labrador
1984 births